Fardapur (alternatively, Phardapur) is a village located in Soegaon Taluka of Aurangabad district, in the Maharashtra state of India.

The population of Fardapur is approximately 10,000, some 90% of whom depend on agriculture.

The Ajantha caves are located nearby.

References

Villages in Aurangabad district, Maharashtra